Flavaspidic acid may refer to:
 Flavaspidic acid BB
 Flavaspidic acid AB
 Flavaspidic acid PB

References